FC Borysfen-2 Boryspil was a Ukrainian football farm team of FC Borysfen Boryspil from Boryspil, Kyiv oblast.

In 2000 the team registered for the 2000 Ukrainian Amateur Cup, but after losing its first game to an amateur club Dnipro Kyiv at home, it refused to continue its participation. In 2000 Borysfen-2 represented a suburb of Kyiv, Shchaslyve.

League and cup history

{|class="wikitable"
|-bgcolor="#efefef"
! Season
! Div.
! Pos.
! Pl.
! W
! D
! L
! GS
! GA
! P
!Domestic Cup
!colspan=2|Europe
!Notes
|-
|-
|align=center|2001–02
|align=center|3rd "B"
|align=center|15
|align=center|34
|align=center|11
|align=center|3
|align=center|20
|align=center|35
|align=center|50
|align=center|36
|align=center|
|align=center|
|align=center|
|align=center|
|-
|align=center|2002–03
|align=center|3rd "B"
|align=center|14
|align=center|30
|align=center|9
|align=center|1
|align=center|20
|align=center|23
|align=center|51
|align=center|28
|align=center|
|align=center|
|align=center|
|align=center|
|-
|align=center|2003–04
|align=center|3rd "A"
|align=center|16
|align=center|30
|align=center|7
|align=center|6
|align=center|17
|align=center|28
|align=center|46
|align=center|27
|align=center|
|align=center|
|align=center|
|align=center bgcolor=red|Relegated
|}

References

FC Borysfen Boryspil
Defunct football clubs in Ukraine
Football clubs in Boryspil
Ukrainian reserve football teams
Association football clubs established in 2000
Association football clubs disestablished in 2004
2000 establishments in Ukraine
2004 disestablishments in Ukraine